Jerome "Jerry" Jeremiah (born 1 August 1963, in Malakula) is a Vanuatuan sprinter

Jeremiah competed at the 1988 Summer Olympics held in Seoul in his country's first-ever appearance at the Summer Olympics; he entered the 100 metres and ran a time of 10.96 seconds and finished 8th in his heat so didn't qualify for the next round. He also ran in the 200 metres and recorded a time of 22.01 seconds and finished 7th in his heat but again he failed to qualify for the next round. He also competed at the 1986 Commonwealth Games and at the 1987 World Championships in Athletics and 1991 World Championships in Athletics.

References

External links
 

1963 births
Living people
People from Malampa Province
Vanuatuan male sprinters
Athletes (track and field) at the 1986 Commonwealth Games
Commonwealth Games competitors for Vanuatu
Athletes (track and field) at the 1988 Summer Olympics
Olympic athletes of Vanuatu
World Athletics Championships athletes for Vanuatu